Nanda Karnataki (8 January 1939 – 25 March 2014) known mononymously as Nanda, was an Indian actress who appeared in Hindi and Marathi films. As one of the most popular actresses in Hindi cinema, her career spans over 30 years and she is best known for her performances in Chhoti Bahen, Dhool Ka Phool, Bhabhi, Kala Bazar, Kanoon, Hum Dono, Jab Jab Phool Khile, Gumnaam, Ittefaq, The Train and Prem Rog.

Early life
Nanda was born in a Maharashtrian show-business family to Vinayak Damodar Karnataki (Master Vinayak), a successful Marathi actor-producer-director. Master Vinayak was related to many personalities in the Indian film industry. His brother Vasudev Karnataki was a cinematographer while noted film personalities Baburao Pendharkar (1896–1967) and Bhalji Pendharkar (1897–1994) were his half-brothers. He was also a maternal cousin of legendary film director V. Shantaram. Master Vinayak was a good friend of the Mangeshkar family and introduced Lata Mangeshkar to the film industry in his movie Pahilee Mangalagaur.

Her father died in 1947, aged 41 when Nanda was seven years old. The family faced hard times. She became a child actress, helping her family by working in films in the early 1950s. As a result of her involvement in movies, her studies suffered, and she was coached at home by renowned school teacher and Bombay Scouts commissioner, Gokuldas V. Makhi. By taking up a career in films, she supported and educated her six siblings. One of her brothers is Marathi film director Jaiprakash Karnataki who is married to actress Jayshree T.

Career

Child actress and Supporting roles

Nanda made her debut with Mandir in 1948. On the silver screen, she was first recognized as "Baby Nanda". In films like Mandir, Jaggu and Angaarey, She was a child actor from 1948 to 1956. 
Nanda's paternal uncle, the renowned film producer-director V. Shantaram gave Nanda a big break by casting her in a successful brother-sister saga; Toofan Aur Diya (1956). It was the saga of an orphaned brother and sister that are buffeted by a series of tragic setbacks, including the girl losing her sight. She received her first Filmfare Award nomination as Best Supporting Actress for Bhabhi (1957), she claims that the reason she didn't win was that there was lobbying involved. She played supporting roles to stars such as Dev Anand in Kala Bazar, and played the second lead in Dhool Ka Phool. Earlier in her career, she acted in many Marathi films. These include
Kuldaivat, Shevgyachyaa Shenga directed by Shantaram Athavale, Deoghar directed  by Raja Paranjpe, Zalegele visrun jaa directed by  Yashwant Patekar, and Aai wina baal with Hansa Wadkar. Nanda was honored by  prime minister Jawaharlal Nehru for her sister's role in Shevgyachyaa shenga.

Leading Lady
She played the title role in L.V. Prasad's Chhoti Bahen (1959). The movie was a big hit, making her a star. In this commercially successful 1959 film,  Nanda played the blind younger sister looked after by two elder brothers, played by Balraj Sahni and Rehman. She then played lead roles, such as one of Dev Anand's heroines in Hum Dono (1961) and Teen Deviyan. Both films were acclaimed as hits. She was the heroine in B.R. Chopra's Kanoon (1960), a film with no songs, which was then rare.

She won the Filmfare Best Supporting Actress Award for Aanchal (1960). She was paired with Raj Kapoor in Aashiq (1962) and she worked with Rajendra Kumar in three films – Toofan Aur Diya (1956), Dhool Ka Phool (1961) and Kanoon (1960). She had quoted in one of her interviews: "Many of my great performances were in films that failed or did average business, like Usne Kaha Tha, Char Diwari, Nartaki, and Aaj Aur Kal."

Nanda was known to encourage newcomers. She signed eight films with Shashi Kapoor at a time when he was yet to become successful in Hindi Cinema. Their first two films as a pair – the critically acclaimed romantic film Char Diwari (1961) and Mehndi Lagi Mere Haath (1962) – did not work, but the rest were successful at the box office. Shashi, though he had achieved success in English films in 1963 and in two Hindi films in 1965, had five flops as solo lead hero from his debut in 1961 till 1965 in Hindi films. In Jab Jab Phool Khile (1965), Nanda played a westernised role for the first time and it helped her image. Her favorite song that was famously picturized on her in the film was "Yeh samaa." Shashi would later declare that Nanda was his favorite heroine. Nanda, too, declared Kapoor as her favourite hero.  In the period 1965 to 1970, the successful films of the pair Shashi-Nanda include Mohabbat Isko Kahete Hain (1965), Jab Jab Phool Khile (1965), Neend Hamari Khwab Tumhare (1966), Raja Saab (1969) and Rootha Na Karo (1970). In the early 1970s, Nanda suggested Rajendra Kumar, co-producer of The Train, to take Rajesh Khanna as the main lead.

She had another hit film in 1965 with Gumnaam, which helped put her in the top league of heroines. With Dharmendra, she worked in Mera Kasoor Kya Hai and Akashdeep. She played lead heroine roles beginning with Choti Bahen and Kanoon from 1959 to 60 and continued to get roles as the main female lead till 1973. She signed with new leading man Rajesh Khanna in the songless suspense thriller Ittefaq (1969), for which she received a Filmfare nomination as Best Actress and which became successful at the box office. After Khanna became a superstar, he signed two more films with her; the thriller The Train (1970) and the comedy Joroo Ka Ghulam (1972) which became hits. Jeetendra, too, had some hit films with her such as Parivar and Dharti Kahe Pukar Ke, with Sanjay Khan, she had a hit in Beti and Abhilasha The three films Ittefaq, The Train and Joru Ka Ghulam – earned more than her earlier hits opposite Shashi Kapoor, Rajendra Kumar, Dev Anand, Sanjeev Kumar and Jeetendra.

Later career and supporting roles

After a small role in Manoj Kumar's Shor (1972), Nanda did a few more critically acclaimed films such as Chhalia (1973) and Naya Nasha (1974), which flopped. Work offers for Nanda dried up  from 1973 as her pairing with other younger actors such as Navin Nischol, Vinod Mehra, Deb Mukherjee and Parikshit Sahni did not work., and she then stopped acting. In 1982, she came back with three successful films, all coincidentally having her play Padmini Kolhapure's mother in Ahista Ahista, Mazdoor and  Raj Kapoor's Prem Rog. Then she permanently retired.

Earnings and ranking

Nanda, who has done some unforgettable work in Bollywood and has given films such as Dhool Ka Phool, Dulhan, Bhabhi, Jab Jab Phool Khile, Gumnaam, Shor, Parineeta, and Prem Rog was one of the highest-paid actresses of her time. She was the second highest-paid Hindi actress, along with Nutan from 1960 to 1965 and second highest-paid Hindi actress from 1966 to 1969 along with Nutan and Waheeda and the third highest paid Hindi actress with Sadhana from 1970 to 1973.

Personal life

In 1965, while filming Jab Jab Phool Khile, director Suraj Prakash recalled that a Maharashtrian lieutenant colonel was smitten by Nanda and had asked him to forward his marriage proposal to her mother. In the end, nothing came of it. Nanda's brothers brought home many suitors for her, but she turned them all down.

In 1992, a middle-aged Nanda became engaged to director Manmohan Desai at the urging of Rehman. But he died after falling from the terrace of his rented flat in Girgaon, just a year after her mother died of cancer. According to reports, the railing he was leaning on collapsed. Nanda remained unmarried.

Nanda lived in her residence in Mumbai, interacting only with family and close friends. Her close friends from the film industry included Waheeda Rehman, Nargis, Asha Parekh, Helen, Saira Banu, Mala Sinha, Sadhana, Shakila and  Jabeen Jaleel. After a long time, she made a public appearance with Waheeda Rehman for a screening of the Marathi film Natarang (2010).

She died in Mumbai on 25 March 2014 at her Versova residence, aged 75, following a heart attack.

Selected filmography

Awards and nominations

References

External links

  Veteran actress Nanda makes a rare appearance in 2010, movies.indiatimes.com. Retrieved 29 March 2014.
 Nanda's official website. Retrieved 29 March 2014.

Indian film actresses
1939 births
2014 deaths
Actresses from Mumbai
Marathi actors
Actresses in Hindi cinema
Child actresses in Hindi cinema
Indian child actresses
Filmfare Awards winners
Actresses in Marathi cinema
20th-century Indian actresses